Rosalind M Heggs (born 1952) is an English former cricketer who played as an all-rounder. She was a right-handed batter and right-arm off break bowler. She played for Young England in the 1973 Women's Cricket World Cup and the full England side in the 1978 Women's Cricket World Cup. She took 16 wickets at an average of 15.43 and scored 56 runs with a high score of 18 in her nine One Day Internationals. She played domestic cricket for Middlesex.

References

External links
 
 

1952 births
Date of birth missing (living people)
Living people
People from Skegness
England women One Day International cricketers
Young England women cricketers
Middlesex women cricketers